Hamatabanus carolinensis is a species of horse flies in the family Tabanidae.

Distribution
United States, Mexico.

References

Tabanidae
Insects described in 1838
Diptera of North America
Taxa named by Pierre-Justin-Marie Macquart